Okahukura in New Zealand may refer to:
Okahukura, Ruapehu, a locality in Ruapehu District to the north of Taumarunui
Okahukura railway station, serving the settlement of Okahukura
Otukou, the location of Okahukura meeting house and Okahukura Bush, in Taupo District